Script Debugger is a Macintosh computer source code editor and debugging environment for the AppleScript programming language, and other languages based on Apple Inc.'s Open Scripting Architecture. It is a product of Late Night Software.

History 

Script Debugger version 1.0 was released in 1995 by Mark Alldritt as a third-party alternative to Apple's freeware application, Script Editor. Its competitors at that time included ScriptWizard and Main Event Software's popular Scripter. These two products today are defunct, leaving only Satimage's Smile and integrated development environments such as FaceSpan (also from Late Night) and AppleScript Studio as Script Debugger's current competitors in the field.

From version 1 on the program contained several notable features: it was "scriptable," (it could be used to create scripts to control itself), recordable, (it could create scripts based on user actions), and attachable, (scripts could be written to respond to events). More importantly, Script Debugger now allowed inspection of running applications to see what events they were emitting. True to its name, the new utility also contained a full debugger, with support for breakpoints.

Script Debugger has since won many awards in the Macintosh scripting community. Version 1 received "5 mice" from MacUser and 4 stars from MacWEEK. Version 2 received the 2000 Macworld Eddy for "Best Development Software", and received "4.5 mice" from both MacUser and Macworld.

On February 9, 2006, version 4 of Script Debugger was released. This version was completely rewritten to take full advantage of the new Cocoa and Tiger APIs. The new release also included an improved version of the JavaScript OSA scripting component.

Version 5 of Script Debugger was released in June 2012.

Version 6 of Script Debugger was released in June 2016, with support for new features such as code folding and AppleScriptObjC.

Version 7 of Script Debugger was released in March 2018, introducing the free "Lite" mode and new features such as version browsing, enhanced applets, better bundle editing.

References

External links
 Script Debugger 7
 AppleScript Editors a comparison of several editors, out of date
 AppleScript Editors, a page of links to AppleScript utilities
 MacUser UK a review of version 3.0.1
 Macworld another review

Macintosh operating systems development
MacOS programming tools